This is a list of busiest airports in Asia, ranked by total passengers per year, which includes arrival, departure and transit passengers. Beijing Capital International Airport has been the busiest airport in Asia since 2009. The tables also shows the percentage change in total passenger traffic over last year. Asian airports are those that are located in the 48 countries and 6 dependent states as defined by UN and fall within the Asian region.

As of 2018, China has 19 airports in the top 50, while Japan has five, India has four, South Korea  has three and Indonesia, Saudi Arabia, Vietnam, UAE, Thailand and Turkey (Asian part) have two each. Hong Kong, Singapore, Malaysia, Taiwan, Philippines, Qatar, and Israel have one each.

At a glance

2018 statistics

2017 statistics

2016 statistics

2015 statistics 
Airports Council International's full-year figures are as follows.

2011 statistics

Airports Council International's preliminary full-year figures are as follows, as of March 19, 2012.

2010 statistics 

Airports Council International's final full-year figures are as follows.

2009 statistics 

Airports Council International's final full year figures are as follows.

2008 statistics

References 

Based on the Airports Council International Data Centre

Aviation in Asia
 Busiest
Asia